Lee Sinje (born 23 January 1976) is a Malaysian film actress and pop singer. She started her career in singing and later moved on to acting in Taiwan and Hong Kong and Malaysia. Lee starred in The Eye, the hit Asian horror film by the Pang Brothers, winning her the Golden Horse Award for Best Actress, Best Actress at the Hong Kong Film Awards and a Hong Kong Golden Bauhinia Awards. She is among the very few Asian artists to be awarded Best Newcomer Awards at the Berlin Film Festival in 2001 for her role in Betelnut Beauty.

Lee has also starred in  the films 20 30 40 (where she co-starred with the person who discovered her, Sylvia Chang), and Koma. She worked with the Pangs again on Re-cycle, which was screened at the 2006 Cannes Film Festival.

Early life
On 23 January 1976, Lee was born in Alor Setar, Kedah, Malaysia to a motorcycle shop owner and a homemaker. During her years in primary school, Lee was an active participant in singing competitions, where she won numerous awards, and in various sport-related activities. At Keat Hwa Secondary School, she was the head of her school's drama club. In 1995, at 19 years old, Lee was discovered by Sylvia Chang at a Kuala Lumpur film audition.

Philanthropy
In 2006, Sinje and her friends, Charlie Yeung, Gigi Leung and Valen Hsu formed "Little Yellow Flower Education Foundation". It is a non-profit organisation to help children in need.

Personal life
She is married to Hong Kong born Thai director Oxide Pang.
Together, the couple has twin boys, born on 8 July 2016.

Filmography

Discography
 1996: 同一個星空下
 1998: Bye Bye 童年
 1999: 第三代李心潔　裙擺搖搖
 2000: 愛像大海
 2003: Man & Woman

References

External links
 

1976 births
Living people
Malaysian film actresses
Malaysian people of Hokkien descent
Malaysian people of Chinese descent
21st-century Malaysian women singers
Malaysian Mandopop singers
People from Alor Setar
20th-century Malaysian actresses
21st-century Malaysian actresses
20th-century Malaysian women singers
Malaysian born Hong Kong artists